Mate (foaled 1928 in Kentucky) was an American Thoroughbred racehorse best known for winning the 1931 Preakness Stakes.

Background
From modest parentage, Mate was bred and raced by Albert C. Bostwick, Jr., whose grandfather was a founding partner of Standard Oil. Mate was trained by Jim Healy and had to race against very strong opponents in 1930 and 1931 when he was part of what the Chicago Tribune newspaper called the "big four"  in racing which included Twenty Grand, Jamestown, and Equipoise.

Racing career

United States
At age two, Mate won several races including two from the most important for his age group, the Breeders' Futurity Stakes and the Champagne Stakes. The following year, in what was the first leg of the 1931 U.S. Triple Crown series, on May 9 Mate beat Twenty Grand to win Preakness Stakes while equaling the stakes record. That year's Kentucky Derby was then run on May 16 and won by Twenty Grand with Mate finishing third behind runner-up, Sweep All. He did not run in the Belmont Stakes but went on to win the prestigious American Derby in Chicago and beat Twenty Grand for the second time while winning the Arlington Classic in which he set a new Arlington Park track record of 2:02 2-5 for 1¼ miles on dirt.

Racing in 1932 and 1933, at age four and five, Mate won the 1933 Thanksgiving Day Handicap at Bowie Race Track, a race he had previously won as a three-year-old. and had second and third-place finishes in some of the major racing events including the Brooklyn and Metropolitan Handicaps.

England
In 1934, the then six-year-old mate was sent to England with the ultimate goal of winning the Ascot Gold Cup at Ascot Racecourse. Having been accustomed to race on flat, oval dirt tracks for most of his career he now had to adapt to European turf courses. He first ran in the Newbury Spring Cup in mid April without showing well, then finished third in the City and Suburban Handicap at Epsom Downs. He was second on the same racecourse in the Coronation Cup but out of the money behind Felicitation in June's Ascot Gold Cup. Mate won his first and only stakes in England on October 19, 1934, capturing the Challenge Stakes at Newmarket Racecourse.

Stud record
Retired to stud duty, from a limited number of offspring, Mate most notably sired Elkridge, a U.S. Racing Hall of Fame inductee who was the American Champion Steeplechase Horse in 1942 and 1946.

Breeding

References

1928 racehorse births
Racehorses bred in Kentucky
Racehorses trained in the United States
Racehorses trained in the United Kingdom
Preakness Stakes winners
Thoroughbred family 22-a